Platevindex burnupi is a species of air-breathing sea slug, a shell-less marine pulmonate gastropod mollusk in the family Onchidiidae.

Description

Distribution 
South Africa and Madagascar.

References 

Onchidiidae
Gastropods described in 1902